This article is about the list of Sport Luanda e Benfica players. Benfica de Luanda is an Angolan football (soccer) club based in Luanda, Angola and plays at Estádio 11 de Novembro.  The club was established in 1922.

2011–2016
S.L. Benfica (Luanda) players 2011–2016

2001–2010
S.L. Benfica (Luanda) players 2001–2010

1991–2000
 Saneamento Rangol / S.L. Benfica (Luanda) players 1996–2000

References

Benfica
S.L. Benfica (Luanda) players
Association football player non-biographical articles